1951 Тарас Шевченко / Taras Shevchenko, directed by Ihor Savchenko
 1952 В степах України / In the Steppes of Ukraine, directed by Tymofiy Levchuk
 1952 Украдене щастя / Stolen Happiness, directed by Hnat Yura (by the drama of Ivan Franko)
 1953 Мартин Боруля / Martyn Borulia, directed by Oleksiy Shvachko
 1955 Іван Франко / Ivan Franko, directed by Tymofiy Levchuk
 1959 Григорій Сковорода / Hryhoriy Shovoroda, directed by Ivan Kavaleridze

1950s
Films
Ukrainian